James Stephens (born May 18, 1951) is an American actor best known for his starring role as James T. Hart in the television series The Paper Chase.

Biography
Stephens was born in Mount Kisco, New York. He is best known for his role as idealistic Minnesota-born law student James T. Hart in The Paper Chase (1978–1979 and 1983–1986), taking on the role originated by Timothy Bottoms in the movie of the same name. He is also known for his role in Tom Bosley's ABC television series, Father Dowling Mysteries (1989-1991), in which Stephens was cast as Father Philip Prestwick.

His first role was as C. L. Bradley in the pilot and two episodes of the ABC western series, How the West Was Won, starring James Arness. He guest-starred in such series as Buffy the Vampire Slayer, Diagnosis: Murder, L.A. Law, Matlock, Moonlighting, M*A*S*H, Eischied, multiple characters on Murder, She Wrote, a recurring role on Cagney & Lacey, and the role of the young Doctor Auschlander in 1945 in flashbacks on St. Elsewhere. His film appearances have included roles in True Grit: A Further Adventure (1978), First Monday in October (1981), The Getaway (1994), A Perry Mason Mystery:The Case of the Lethal Lifestyle (1994), and Against the Law (1997).

References

External links
 
 

1951 births
Living people
American male film actors
American male television actors
Male actors from New York (state)
People from Mount Kisco, New York